Bayandor may refer to:
Bayandor-e Olya, a village in Kermanshah Province, Iran
Bayandor-e Sofla, a village in Kermanshah Province, Iran
Bayendar, a village in Zanjan Province, Iran
Darioush Bayandor, Iranian diplomat
Gholamali Bayandor (1898-1941), Iranian admiral
Bayandor-class corvette, ships in the Iranian Navy